Sayed Hassan Amin (born 28 November 1948) is an Iranian lawyer, philosopher, scholar, author and pro-democracy political figure.

Early life and education 
Born in Sabzavar, Iran, Amin attended Tehran University at the age of 17 and obtained a bachelor in Law with distinction. After completing his apprenticeship in the Ministry of Justice he qualified as a judge, working in different judicial capacities in Iran while reading for his LLM (Masters in private law) at the University of Tehran.

He then went to Glasgow University in Scotland where he obtained his PhD in 1978 under the supervision of Professor John Grant, who was later the dean of the Faculty of Law at the same university as well as Professor of Law in Lewis & Clark law school.

Amin started his examinations and practical apprenticeship with solicitors under the regulations of the Faculty of Advocates in July 1980 in Scotland and was admitted as a member of the Faculty of Advocates on 10 July 1992.

Academic career
 Amin started his academic career with an appointment as lecturer in law. After three years he became a Senior Lecturer in law, and after another five became Reader in law. He was appointed a visiting professor of international trade law in the faculty of law in Tehran University in October 1988. Finally, in April 1992, he was elevated to the rank of full-time Professor of Law at Glasgow Caledonian University.

Amin was a Visiting Professor and distinguished International scholar at Beijing Foreign Studies University, teaching in both the School of Law and the School of Asian and African Studies. He is currently an International Honorary Professor of Law at Hakim Sabzevari University in Iran.

Legal practice
Amin is an advocate in Scotland and an attorney at law in Iran. He qualified as a member of the Faculty of Advocates and practised international law at the Scottish bar, specialising in transnational law and in private international law with specific reference to Islamic and Iranian law. Amin was a Patron of the Prisoners Abroad and the Scottish Representative and a board member of World Development Movement as well as member of the Liberal Democrat Party and Amnesty International in the 1980s. His legal practice in Tehran is now primarily to give advice to European companies doing business with Iran and representing them in the Iranian Courts.

Specialty areas 

 Giving legal advice, opinion and expert evidence on all aspects of Iranian law in courts and tribunals worldwide.
 International and Comparative Law with particular reference to Iranian Law.
 Islamic and Iranian studies with particular reference to Philosophy, Law and Politics.

Academic credentials 

 Bachelor of Law, 1969, University of Tehran.
 Masters of Law, 1974, University of Glasgow.
 PhD in Law, 1979, University of Glasgow. (Joint prize of the Faculties of Law and Humanities, 1978.)

Publications
Amin has published more than 60 books and 200 research articles, as well as contributing to learned journals and encyclopedias. For the past 12 years he has been writing mostly in Persian. He is also the Editor-in-Chief of Hafiz Monthly on Iranian studies of which 103 issues has been published over the past 10 years. His 1985 books, Middle East Legal Systems and Islamic Law in the Contemporary World: Introduction, Glossary and Bibliography, were widely reviewed, with the American Journal of International Law, a contribution to their field, essential to the international lawyer's library." He is also the Editor-in-Chief of literary journals Hafez and Iran-mehr. He began writing an encyclopedia about Iran with other academics in 2004.

In English
Basic Documents in Iranian Law
Basic Documents in Iraqi Law
Commercial Law of Iran
International and Legal Problems of the Gulf
Islamic Banking and Finance
Islamic Government and Revolution in Iran
Islamic Law in the Contemporary World
Israel and the Occupied Arab Territories
Law and Government in the Arab World
Law and Justice in Muslim Africa
Letters from Iran
The Civil Code of Iran
Marine Pollution in International and Middle East Law
Middle East Legal Systems
Political and Strategic Issues in the Gulf
Politics and Government in Algeria
Politics and Government in the Post-Revolution Iran
Remedies for Breach of Contract in Islamic and Iranian Law
Studies in Arab Law
Trading with Iran
Third World Law Dictionary
Wrongful Appropriation in Islamic Law
Legal and Political Structure of an Islamic State
Law of Contract in Middle East
The Legal System of Iraq
Legal Education in Developing Countries
The Reason (Masha`ir) by Mulla Sadra
The Light of Truth
Finality of Prophethood

In Persian
Some of Hassan Amin's publications in Persian are as follows.
The History of Law in Iran
Iran Nameh: The History of Iran in Verse
Divan e Amin: The Collected Poems of Professor S.H. Amin
Poetry Encyclopedia
Modern Literature in  Iran
A Rich Record: The Cultural, Political and Societal Transformation of Iran Under the Pahlavis
Encyclopedia of Sleep and Dreams
The Complete Collection of the Persian Poems of Mulla Hadi Sabzevari
The Greek Philosophical Allegory of Salaman and Absal
Compendiums in Traditional Medicine in Verse in Persian and Arabic
The Encyclopedia of Iran In Verse
Amin's Persian Odes

Translations from English to Persian
Untimely Meditations (a book by Friedrich Nietzsche)

Translations from Arabic to Persian
Shavahed o noboveh

Cited
A selection of reviews on previous books by Hassan Amin:
 "the latest of a long line of authoritative contributions by thus distinguished author...' a serious definitive legal study and a valuable work of reference ....".
 "Prof Hassan Amin ranks amongst the world's most distinguished authorities on Iranian and Islamic law and he is a prolific writer on these subjects ...".
"Hassan Amin's name is quite familiar to the legal circles and he has a formidable reputation for his works on Middle East legal systems. For those in India who are involved, with or without credentials, in the controversy regarding Islamic law there is an important message in Amin's various works including the one under review -that this legal system has in its fabric much more than mere matrimonial law or even personal law. Many aspects of comprehensive Islamic jurisprudence which not only remain unexplored in India but whose very existence is unknown in this country have been this favourite Commercial Arbitration in Islamic and Iranian Law subjects of this learned author ... Amin's book is an extremely valuable addition to the meagre literature in the English language on modern Muslim law.".
Amin displayed considerable courage in undertaking the description of the tangled conflicting claims to territory and access to maritime economic resources in the Gulf. Through the efforts of legal scholars like Dr. Amin, it is hoped that international process in the Gulf can be conducted by means of the peaceful acts of diplomacy, arbitration and negotiation.".
"Amin, born in Iran and practising law in London, is well-known as an authority on Islamic law. This latest work certainly supports his reputation.... Amin's book is a fine contribution to the study of the legal systems of fifteen Middle East countries that base their legal systems on Islam. As it standards, Middle East Legal Systems is a thorough and expertly researched encyclopaedia of many of the legal systems of the Islamic Middle East.".
For its originality, for the reference it contains, and the enlightening accounts it conveys. Middle East Legal Systems seems to me an indispensable instrument of work for any person involved in Middle Eastern Affairs".
"As an academic jurist, Amin is at his best on constitutions, marine law, the Shari'a and human rights. He is familiar with text and documentations. His heart is in the right place. He is in favour of democracy and the rules of law, which he honestly does not find in the Middle East. He recommends regional co-ordination, economic development by appropriate technology, "Marshall aid" from the Gulf Cooperation Council to make good the damage of the war between Iran and Iraq and "political, social and cultural progress" without too much Westernisation. Amin tries hard to be objective in his analysis and even-handed between the combatants ... ".
"The book is well written and produced with a comprehensive index. The material has been well researched and its bibliography will be useful to anyone wishing to gain more in depth information on any particular country or area of law. The book will be useful not only to students and academics with an interest in Middle East but also to legal practitioners dealing with complex problems involving law of the islamic countries of the Middle East."
"Amin, a recognised authority in Islamic law, has written a lucid study of Iran's economic and legal systems and its commercial law before and after the 1979 revolution.".
providing a solid understanding of the law in this geographic region".
"Amin, an international lawyer, is at his best covering the legal aspects of Gulf security".
"The author gives a fine description of the Shi'a sect in Chapter 3, and a brief but excellent introduction of the major Islamic schools of jurisdiction in chapter 4.".
"When all is said and done, this remains a fascinating book and one which attempts to fill a very real gap in the English language literature. One can only hope for an enlarged second edition fairly soon."
"Prof. Amin's book ... is admirably brief and is notable for the clear and practical information given in it".

References

Iranian expatriate academics
University of Tehran alumni
1948 births
Academics of Glasgow Caledonian University
Iranian legal scholars
20th-century Iranian lawyers
Living people
People from Sabzevar
National Front (Iran) politicians
Iran Party politicians
Liberal Democrats (UK) people
Shahnameh Researchers
21st-century Iranian lawyers
21st-century Scottish lawyers